Confederation Building may refer to:

Confederation Building (Newfoundland and Labrador), home of the Newfoundland and Labrador House of Assembly
Confederation Building (Ottawa), a 1931 Canadian federal government office building in Ottawa
Confederation Building (Winnipeg)
Confederation Building (Montreal), an office building in Montreal